The following lists events that happened during 2006 in Libya.

Incumbents
Prime Minister: Shukri Ghanem (until 5 March), Baghdadi Mahmudi (starting 5 March)

Events

February
 February 8 - Chad and Sudan sign the Tripoli Agreement, proposed by Libya, ending the Chadian-Sudanese conflict.
 February 17 - At least eleven protesters are killed in riots protesting the Muhammad cartoons in Tripoli outside the Italian consulate in Benghazi, Italian consulate set on fire.

May
 May 15 - The United States State Department announces it will re-establish diplomatic ties with Libya and remove it from its list of states that sponsor terrorism.

July
 July 29 - Somali Premier Ali Mohammed Ghedi alleges that Libya, Egypt, and Iran are supplying the Islamic Courts Union with weaponry.

 
2000s in Libya
Libya
Years of the 21st century in Libya
Libya